Caleb Paine (born November 15, 1990) is an American sailor. He represented his country at the 2016 Summer Olympics. Paine started sailing at age 6 in the dingy favored by Southern California yacht clubs called a Sabot at Mission Bay Yacht Club. He later transferred to Southwestern Yacht Club and started sailing in the Laser Class of sailboat in national competition. He attended Point Loma High School in San Diego and sailed on their sailing team. Forgoing college, Paine began his Olympic campaign in earnest in the Finn Class as his size demanded. He began traveling the world to compete, raising money any way he could to stay in competition. He worked closely with silver medalist and fellow American Zach Railey as his training partner leading up to the 2012 Olympics in London where Railey competed. He continued to train and develop his equipment and skills leading up to the 2016 Games in Rio. A very hard fought battle with former training partner Railey resulted in Paine's earning the right to sail in Rio. The racing in Rio was equally challenging both off the water and on but Paine secured the Bronze Medal in the final medal race by posting a dominant win. For winning the Bronze Medal in the Rio Olympics Paine also was awarded the title of US Sailor of the Year.

References

External links 
 
 
 
 

1990 births
Living people
American male sailors (sport)
Olympic bronze medalists for the United States in sailing
Sailors at the 2016 Summer Olympics – Finn
Medalists at the 2016 Summer Olympics
2021 America's Cup sailors
American Magic
US Sailor of the Year